The final 14 episodes of Columbo were produced sporadically as a series of specials, spanning 13 years from 1990 to 2003. These episodes have since been released on DVD in several regions as "season 10". Two of the episodes, "No Time to Die" and "Undercover", were based on 87th Precinct novels by Ed McBain and thus do not follow the usual Columbo format.

Episodes

References

Columbo 10
1990 American television seasons
1991 American television seasons
1992 American television seasons
1993 American television seasons
1994 American television seasons
1995 American television seasons
1997 American television seasons
1998 American television seasons
2000 American television seasons
2003 American television seasons